Declan Michael Laird (born 1993) is a Scottish actor and a graduate of the Stella Adler Studio of Acting. He is possibly best known for his roles in Hot Air, Green Rush and Big Dogs.

Life and acting career

Declan Michael Laird was born in Kilmacolm in Scotland. A keen footballer, he left school at 15 to pursue a professional career and signed with Greenock Morton F.C. Eight minutes into a cup tie between Greenock Morton and Hearts, Laird tore his anterior cruciate ligament in his right knee effectively ending his professional footballing career.

After exploring the possibility of taking up coaching as a career, Laird turned his attention to acting. In 2008, he was introduced to an acting agency by longterm friend Jim Sweeney and landed the role of Sean in the Scottish soap opera River City and went on to appear in a number of episodes before departing in 2011. The following year he starred in the critically acclaimed short film, The Lost Purse in which Laird played the leading role of The Kid. The film told the story a young deaf man who notices that a pretty girl sitting across from him on the train has left behind her purse on the seat. Eager to return the purse to its owner, the kid retraces his steps on his journey to try and track her down. The film was well received and earned Laird a Best Acting accolade at the Write Camera Action event in Glasgow in 2012.

In 2011, whilst on holiday in Los Angeles, Laird was convinced by his father to take part in an acting workshop hosted by the Stella Adler Studio of Acting. Initially hesitant to take part, Laird was eventually bribed $50 by his father and despite having no previous acting training, the staff were so impressed by his performance that they offered Laird a fully funded scholarship for the young actor to study in America. Whilst studying, Laird has appeared in a number of productions in America in both theatre and in film. In 2014, he landed the role of Colin in the American online drama Camp Abercorn. Set in the Rocky Mountains, the online series centres around Camp Abercorn run by a fictional scout like organisation called the Compass Guides of America. Colin, a British teenager, is forced to work against his will at the camp by his uncle. The series which premiered in September 2014 was crowd funded online and was endorsed by former Star Trek actor George Takei.

In 2014, Laird became the face of Coca-Cola for their commercial surrounding the 2014 FIFA World Cup. In the same year, he was invited to take part in the BAFTA Los Angeles Newcomers Program. The program is aimed at UK industry professionals and students who work in or study film or television and have recently moved to Los Angeles. In 2015, he returned to Scotland briefly to join the judging panel of the 2015 The Scottish Short Film Festival, three years after winning the Best Actor accolade at the same festival. Later this year, Laird will begin filming for the feature film The Rectory opposite Robert Portal. The horror thriller will follows paranormal investigator Harry Price who hosts a year-long experiment in England's most haunted house. In addition to this, filming will begin around Christmas time for The Street in which Laird will be playing the role of a boxer.

In May 2016, it was announced on the Stella Adler alumni website that Laird had been cast as Joe in The Ice Cream Truck and that he was also co producing a television series called The Wake Up as well as a documentary about the 2016 Homeless World Cup which took place in his hometown of Glasgow. In June, Camp Abercorn received its first major screening in America playing at the 2016 edition of SeriesFest. Laird also appeared in two BuzzFeed videos where he took on the challenge of  taste testing pumpkin spice lattes from 5 popular coffee chains, and starred alongside Carmen Electra promoting Dollar Shave Club blades and products.

Laird recently appeared in the 2017 Amazon Prime Production of Ghost Recon Wildlands: War Within the Cartel playing the role of CIA Analyst Ryan Williams. 2017 will also see Laird star in the horror comedy film The Ice Cream Truck. In September, Laird completed filming on the feature film Hot Air starring Steve Coogan. The film is scheduled for release in 2018.

Personal life

Despite his injury, Laird is still a keen footballer and often plays on Sundays for the Hollywood All Stars which is captained by actor Vinnie Jones. In 2014 he returned to Scotland to take on the Tough Mudder challenge as well as playing in a charity celebrity football match at Celtic Park. He also trains on a weekly basis with ex world champion boxer Terry Norris.

Laird has also ventured into modelling for such brands as Dunmore Scotland.

In 2013, he was listed as one of the top 50 Glaswegian Tweeters on Twitter by the Herald newspaper in Scotland.

Filmography

Film

Television

Awards and nominations

References

External links

Declan Michael Laird Interview at Write Camera Action

Living people
1993 births
Scottish male film actors
Scottish male stage actors
Scottish male television actors
21st-century Scottish male actors